Mamadou Kamissoko (born 15 April 1993) is a French professional footballer who plays as a defender for Boulogne.

Club career
A youth product of Bordeaux's youth academy, Kamissoko began his footballing career in the lower divisions of France before joining FC Lorient on 9 June 2017. He made his professional debut with Lorient in a 1–0 Coupe de la Ligue win over Valenciennes FC on 14 August 2018.

He spent the early part of 2021 in the Cypriot league with Nea Salamina. In late November 2021, he returned to France and signed with Boulogne in Championnat National.

Personal life
Born in France, Kamissoko is of Malian descent.

References

External links
 
 FCL Profile
 Foot National Profile

1993 births
Living people
People from Le Blanc-Mesnil
Footballers from Seine-Saint-Denis
Association football defenders
French footballers
French sportspeople of Malian descent
FC Lorient players
Red Star F.C. players
US Concarneau players
Bergerac Périgord FC players
Pau FC players
Nea Salamis Famagusta FC players
US Boulogne players
Ligue 2 players
Championnat National players
Championnat National 2 players
Championnat National 3 players
Cypriot First Division players
French expatriate footballers
Expatriate footballers in Cyprus
French expatriate sportspeople in Cyprus